Eduardo Federico Martínez Colombo (born 18 November 1984 in Florida) is an Uruguayan football player, currently playing for Oriente Petrolero in the Liga de Fútbol Profesional Boliviano.

Martinez started his career in his native Uruguay where he scored 11 goals in 35 games played with Rampla Juniors.  He was then transferred to Deportes Antofagasta where he scored 4 goals in 13 games.  Unfortunately, that year the club was relegated to second division. During 2009, he played for Cabofriense of Brazil but left early due to the club's financial situation.

In 2010, he signed with Singapore Armed Forces FC where he scored a total of 12 goals, including 10 in S-League and 2 in AFC Champions League.  One of these goals -scored versus Corean champions Suwon Samsung Bluewings was chosen "Goal of the Month" by the Asian fans.  In October 2010, he was chosen Player of the Month in S-League; he scored 6 goals in 4 games played with Singapore Armed Forces FC, including scoring goals number 1,000 and 1,001 in the history of the club.

In March, 2011 Martinez moved to Latvia, signing a contract with the Latvian Higher League club FK Ventspils.  He scored his first official goal in Latvian Higher League on April 17, 2011 against JFK Olimps/RFS. On November 5, 2011 FK Ventspils won the title of the Latvian Higher League.  Martinez, who played as an attacking midfielder, scored 8 goals in 26 games. He helped FK Ventspils win the title and lift the Latvian Football Cup again in 2013. During his spell with FK Ventspils Martinez participated in the UEFA Champions League and the UEFA Europa League matches.

In January 2014 Martinez joined the Liga de Fútbol Profesional Boliviano club Oriente Petrolero.

Honours 
FK Ventspils
 Latvian Higher League champion (2): 2011, 2013
 Latvian Cup winner (2): 2010-11, 2012–13

References 
http://www.isoccerconsultants.com/2009/02/e-federico-martinez-24-striker.html
http://www.safwarriors.com.sg/home/index.php?option=com_content&view=article&id=204:new-look-side-gets-down-to-business&catid=8:club-happenings&Itemid=25
http://www.safwarriors.com.sg/home/index.php?option=com_content&view=article&id=308:player-profile-federico-martinez&catid=8:club-happenings&Itemid=25
http://www.safwarriors.com.sg/home/index.php?option=com_content&view=article&id=300:ricos-rocket-named-goal-of-the-month&catid=8:club-happenings&Itemid=25
https://web.archive.org/web/20110327150025/http://sportacentrs.com/futbols/lmt_virsliga/25032011-ventspils_pastiprinas_ar_urugvajiesu_uzbr
https://web.archive.org/web/20160304081228/http://futbolflorida.com/2014/01/12/federico-martinez-a-bolivia/

1984 births
Living people
Uruguayan footballers
Uruguayan expatriate footballers
People from Florida Department
Defensor Sporting players
Rampla Juniors players
FK Ventspils players
Rosario Central footballers
C.D. Antofagasta footballers
Warriors FC players
Oriente Petrolero players
Singapore Premier League players
Expatriate footballers in Brazil
Expatriate footballers in Argentina
Expatriate footballers in Chile
Expatriate footballers in Bolivia
Expatriate footballers in Latvia
Expatriate footballers in Singapore
Association football forwards